Richard Allen York (September 4, 1928 – February 20, 1992) was an American radio, stage, film, and television actor. He was the first actor to play Darrin Stephens on the ABC fantasy sitcom Bewitched. He played teacher Bertram Cates in the film Inherit the Wind (1960). 

York's career was hampered by a serious back injury he sustained while working on the film They Came to Cordura in 1959; although his role in Bewitched was a success, he left the series in 1969 after a further decline in his physical health, and rarely acted thereafter.

Early life
York was born in Fort Wayne, Indiana to Bernard York, a salesman, and Betty, a seamstress. He grew up in Chicago, where a Catholic nun first recognized his vocal promise. He began his career at the age of 15 as the star of the CBS radio program That Brewster Boy. He also appeared in hundreds of other radio shows and instructional films before heading to New York City, where he acted on Broadway in Tea and Sympathy and Bus Stop. He performed with stars including Paul Muni and Joanne Woodward in live television broadcasts and with Janet Leigh, Jack Lemmon, and Glenn Ford in movies, including My Sister Eileen and Cowboy.

While filming the movie They Came to Cordura (1959) with Gary Cooper and Rita Hayworth, he suffered a permanent, disabling back injury. In York's own words, "Gary Cooper and I were propelling a handcar carrying several 'wounded' men down [the] railroad track. I was on the bottom stroke of this sort of teeter-totter mechanism that made the handcar run. I was just lifting the handle up as the director yelled 'cut!' and one of the 'wounded' cast members reached up and grabbed the handle. Now, instead of lifting the expected weight, I was suddenly, jarringly, lifting his entire weight off the flatbed180 pounds or so. The muscles along the right side of my back tore. They just snapped and let loose. And that was the start of it all: the pain, the painkillers, the addiction, the lost career."

York's injury did not immediately end his career. In 1960, a year after York's injury, he played Bertram Cates (modeled on John Thomas Scopes, of "Monkey Trial" fame) in the film version of Inherit the Wind.

York went on to star with Gene Kelly and Leo G. Carroll in the ABC comedy-drama Going My Way (1962). York was cast in the series, which lasted one season, as Tom Colwell, who operates a secular youth center.

York appeared in dozens of episodes of now-classic television series, including Justice, Alfred Hitchcock Presents, The Alfred Hitchcock Hour, The Untouchables, Rawhide, The Americans, Wagon Train, Father Knows Best, and CBS's The Twilight Zone and Route 66.

Bewitched

York was cast as Darrin Stephens in the 1960s sitcom Bewitched as Samantha's (Elizabeth Montgomery) mortal husband. The show was a huge success and York was nominated for an Emmy Award in 1968.

The crew built York a slanted wall on which he could lean between scenes; during the first two seasons, this allowed York to manage his back injury with little difficulty. Halfway through the third season, York's back injury was aggravated into a painful degenerative spine condition, frequently causing shooting delays while he required assistance to walk. Because York would sometimes be seized with debilitating pain, the scripts for some of his later Bewitched episodes were written and staged such that his character would be in bed or on the couch for the entire episode. York did not appear in several third- and fourth-season episodes, and his eventual departure from the show well into the filming of the fifth season necessitated more episodes focusing on Samantha and other members of her family, with mentions that Darrin was away on business. 

While filming the fifth-season episode "Daddy Does His Thing," York fell ill: "I was too sick to go on. I had a temperature of 105, full of strong antibiotics, for almost 10 days. I went to work that day, but I was sick. I lay in my dressing room after being in make-up, waiting to be called on the set. They knew I was feeling pretty rotten, and they tried to give me time to rest. I kept having chills. This was the middle of the summer and I was wearing a sheepskin jacket and I was chilling. I was shaking all over. Then, while sitting on a scaffolding with Maurice Evans, being lit for a special-effects scene: They were setting an inkythat's a little tiny [spotlight] that was supposed to be just flickering over my eyes. That flickering, flickering, flickering made me feel weird. And I'm sitting on this platform up in the air... and I turned to Gibby, who was just down below, and I said, 'Gibby, I think I have to get down.' He started to help me down and that's the last thing I remember until I woke up on the floor. That's about all I remember of the incident... and I'd managed to bite a very large hole in the side of my tongue before they could pry my teeth apart."

From York's hospital bed, he and director William Asher discussed York's future. "Do you want to quit?" Asher asked. "If it's all right with you, Billy," York replied. With that, York left the sitcom to devote himself to recovery, never to return. Dick Sargent replaced York in the role of Darrin Stephens, taking over the role at the start of the series' sixth season (1969–1970) and continuing in the part until the series ended after its eighth season (1971–1972). Sargent was originally offered the role of Darrin in 1964, but declined in favor of a part in the short-lived sitcom Broadside.

Later years
For the next 18 months, York was largely bed-ridden in a haze of prescription painkillers. In his memoir, The Seesaw Girl and Me, published posthumously, he describes the struggle to break his addiction and come to grips with the loss of his career. The book is in large part a love letter to his wife, Joan (née Alt), the seesaw girl of the title, who stuck with him through the hard times.

He then quit drugs cold turkey, which led to six months' difficult withdrawal and recovery. "I had a band playing in my head, bagpipes night and day," York recalled. "It just went on and on and on and on and on... The fans whisper to you and the walls whisper to you and you look at television and sometimes it flashes in a certain way that sends you into a fit and you know that your wife has put her hand in your mouth so you won't bite off your tongue. You can't sleep. You hallucinate. I used to make a tape recording of rain so I could listen to the rain lying in bed at night to drown out those damned bagpipes."

York eventually beat his addiction, and in the early 1980s tried to revive his career. His last two credits were on two primetime television series, Simon & Simon and Fantasy Island.

Death
York was a three-pack-a-day smoker for much of his life and often smoked cigarettes on the set of Bewitched; he spent his final years battling emphysema. By 1989, he was using an oxygen tank to help him breathe. While bedridden in his Rockford, Michigan, home, he founded Acting for Life, a private charity to help the homeless and others in need. Using his telephone as his pulpit, York motivated politicians, business people, and the general public to contribute supplies and money.

Despite his suffering, York said, "I've been blessed. I have no complaints. I've been surrounded by people in radio, on stage, and in motion pictures and television who love me. The things that have gone wrong have been simply physical things."

York died of complications from emphysema at Blodgett Hospital in East Grand Rapids, Michigan, on February 20, 1992, at age 63. He is buried at Plainfield Cemetery in Rockford, Michigan.

Filmography

Awards and nominations
Emmy Awards
 1968: Nominated, "Outstanding Continued Performance by an Actor in a Leading Role in a Comedy Series"- Bewitched

See also

References

 York, Dick. The Seesaw Girl and Me (New Path Press, 2004) pp. 15–16, 100–105.

External links
 
 
 
 

1928 births
1992 deaths
Actors from Fort Wayne, Indiana
American male film actors
American male radio actors
American male stage actors
American male television actors
Deaths from emphysema
Male actors from Indiana
Male actors from Chicago
Male actors from Grand Rapids, Michigan
Male actors from New York City
Male actors from Los Angeles
20th-century American male actors
Burials in Michigan
People from Rockford, Michigan
Bewitched